Babu I Love You is an Oriya drama and romance film released on 9 May 2005.  Starring Chandan Kar, Siddhanta Mahapatra, Archita Sahu and Anu Chowdhury in key roles.

Synopsis
Raghupati is a cruel and powerful man in the village. He kills the Jamidar of the village, occupies his palace and keeps his daughter Arati under terror. Also keeps Jagu as a slave, because Jagu's father exchange him against the loan he takes from Raghupati. Arati and Jagu as are in the same fate love each other. Raghupati with his aids Raghsb and Rajaram exploits and rules the poor people of the village. One day a forest officer Akash comes to the village to look after nearby forest. He meets Bijuli by an accident and both falls in love each other. Gradually due his noble qualities, Akash becomes the ideal voice of the village. Akash counters and tries to stop the illegal activities the trio Raghupati, Raghab and Rajaram.

One day Akash goes to the town to attend head office.. Before leaving, he asks his faithful dog to guard Bijuli. But Bijuli tires of the dog's constant attention and locks him up. The trio Raghpati, Raghab and Rajaram tries to rape Bijuli. To save herself from rape, Bijuli suicides by stabbing herself. An enraged and heartbroken Akash lashes the dog for failing to guard Bijli, but Arati and Jagu holds back, telling him that Bijuli herself locked the dog up. Eventually Akash brutally murdered by the trio and Jagu falsely send to jail for the murder. But the faithful dog comes to rescue, collects the evidence that Raghupati, Raghab and Rajaram are the culprits. Finally the trio arrested. Jagu and Arati marries at last.

Cast
 Siddhanta Mahapatra as Jaganath / Jagu
 Anu Choudhury as Arati
 Chandan Kar as Akash
 Bijoy Mohanty as Bijuli's father
 Archita Sahu as Bijuli
 Raimohan Parida as Raghupati
 Jairam Samal as Rajaram
 Papi Santuka as Raghab
 Biju Badajena as Police Inspector
 Premanjana Parida as Jamidar (Arati's father)
 Kanta Singh as Village Lady
 Tapas Roy as Naga
 Subhranshu Sarangi as Police Inspector
 Bapi as Hotel owner
 Seema as Neuli
 Rajat Rajpoot as Young Akash

Soundtrack
The Music for the film is composed by Manmath Misra

Awards
 Orissa State Film Awards 2006
 Best Actress in a supporting role ... Archita Sahu
 Best Art Director ... Amiya Maharana

References

External links
 

2005 films
2000s Odia-language films
Odia remakes of Hindi films